Standard may refer to:

Symbols 
 Colours, standards and guidons, kinds of military signs
 Standard (emblem), a type of a large symbol or emblem used for identification

Norms, conventions or requirements 

 Standard (metrology), an object that bears a defined relationship to a unit of measure used for calibration of measuring devices
 Standard (timber unit), an obsolete measure of timber used in trade
 Breed standard (also called bench standard), in animal fancy and animal husbandry
 BioCompute Standard, a standard for next generation sequencing
 De facto standard, product or system with market dominance
 Gold standard, a monetary system based on gold; also used metaphorically for the best of several options, against which the others are measured
 Internet Standard, a specification ratified as an open standard by the Internet Engineering Task Force
 Learning standards, standards applied to education content
 Standard displacement, a naval term describing the weight and status of a warship
 Standard language, a particular variety of a language accepted as the institutionalized norm in a community
 Standard solution, in chemistry, a solution of known concentration
 Standard of care,  the degree of prudence and caution required of an individual who is under a duty of care
 Technical standard, an established norm or requirement about technical systems
 International standard, standards suitable for worldwide use
 Open standard, a standard that is publicly available
 Standard operating procedure, a step-by-step instruction to achieve a desired result
 Standardization, the process of establishing technical standards
 Standards organization, an entity primarily concerned with maintaining standards
 Standard-gauge railway (SGR)

Mathematics 
 Standard algorithms, long-taught methods of computation such as long division
 Standard deviation, a statistical measure of variation
 Standard score, a statistics term
 Standard part function, used to define the derivative of a function
 Standard Young tableaux, a type of combinatorial object
 Standardized rate, a statistical measure of any rates in a population

Military 
 Standard-type battleships produced by the U.S. Navy
 Standard Missile
 Standard operating procedure, an established method of accomplishing a task
 United States Military Standard, a specification used to help achieve standardization objectives by the U.S. Department of Defense

Places

United States 
 Standard, Illinois
 Standard City, Illinois
 Standard, California
 Standard, Indiana
 Standard, LaSalle Parish, Louisiana
 Standard, Vernon Parish, Louisiana
 Standard, West Virginia

Other places
 Standard, Alberta, Canada

Arts, entertainment, and media

Music

Groups
 The Standard (band), an American indie rock band
 The Standard, a rap trio formed by Nas, Common and Q-Tip

Musical terms and concepts
 Standard (music), the most popular and enduring songs from a particular genre or style
 Adult standards, a radio format that includes pop standards
 Jazz standards, musical compositions which are an important part of the musical repertoire of jazz musicians, in that they are widely known, performed, and recorded by jazz musicians, and widely known by listeners
 List of blues standards, blues songs that have attained a high level of recognition
 Pop standards, particularly the songs comprising the Great American Songbook

Albums
 Standard (Scandal album), the fifth studio album by Japanese pop rock band, Scandal
 Standard (Witness album), a gospel music album by Witness
 Standards (Sonny Clark album), 1998
 Standards (Lloyd Cole album), a 2013 rock album by Lloyd Cole released
 Standards (Grant Green album), a 1998 album by jazz guitarist Grant Green first released in Japan in 1980 as Remembering
 Standards (Into It. Over It. album)
 Standards, Vol. 1, a 1983 album by jazz pianist Keith Jarrett
 Standards, Vol. 2, a 1985 album by jazz pianist Keith Jarrett
 Standards (Lee Morgan album), a 1998 album by jazz trumpeter Lee Morgan released on the Blue Note label
 Standards (Tortoise album), the fourth album by the American post-rock band Tortoise
 Standards (Ken Vandermark album), 1995
 Standards (Seal album), a 2017 album by Seal
 Standards (Bernie Worrell album), solo album by former Parliament-Funkadelic keyboardist Bernie Worrell
 Standards, music album by Blaggards
 The Standard (Tommy Flanagan album), a 1980 album by The Super Jazz Trio
 The Standard (Take 6 album), a 2008 album by Take 6
 The Standards, a 2013 studio album by Gloria Estefan

Songs
 "Standard" (The View song), a song by The View
 "Standards", a song by The Jam from the album This Is the Modern World

Periodicals
 Standard (magazine), a defunct Serbian magazine
 Der Standard, an Austrian newspaper
 Dunoon Observer and Argyllshire Standard, a Scottish newspaper
 London Evening Standard, a London newspaper often referred to as "The Standard"
 Mornington Standard, newspaper of Frankston, Victoria
 Standard (Frankston), a later name
 The Port Melbourne Standard newspaper of Port Melbourne, Victoria
 The Standard (Port Melbourne) an earlier name 
 Standard (Thailand), a defunct weekly newspaper published in Thailand
 St. Catharines Standard, a St. Catharines, Ontario, newspaper
 Toronto Standard online newspaper, also an historical (1848–1849) paper
 The Standard (Hong Kong), a business newspaper in Hong Kong
 The Standard (Kenya), a Kenyan newspaper
 The Standard (Zimbabwe), a weekly newspaper in Zimbabwe
 The Weekly Standard, an American neoconservative magazine, sometimes abbreviated as The Standard

Television
 The Standard (TV series), a television series

Sports 
 FK Standard Sumgayit, a former Azeri association football team
 Standard Liège, a Belgian association football team that is often abbreviated as Standard

Vehicles

Automotive 
 Standard (1904 automobile) (1904–1906), an American automobile
 Standard (1911 automobile) (1911–1912), a German automobile
 Standard (1912 automobile) (1912–1923), an American automobile manufactured in Butler, Pennsylvania
 Standard (Indian automobile) (1957–1987), mostly based on the British Standard cars
 Standard (Italian automobile) (1906–1908), an Italian automobile manufactured by the Fabbrica Automobili Standard of Torino
 Standard Electric (automobile) (1911-1915) an American electric automobile manufactured in Jackson, Michigan 
 Standard Motor Company (1903–1963), an English car and aircraft manufacturer
 Standard Motor Products, a manufacturer and distributor of aftermarket automotive parts
 Standard Six (1909–1910), an American automobile manufactured in St Louis, Missouri
 Standard Steam Car (1920–1921), an American steam car manufactured by the Standard Engineering Company of St Louis, Missouri
 Standard Superior, and automotive manufacturer, e.g., of the Standard automobile (1933–1935, 1950–1954), produced from 1933 to 1935 by Standard Fahrzeugfabrik of Ludwigsburg, Germany
 Standard transmission, a type of transmission used in motor vehicles

Aviation 
 FAI Standard Class, for glider competition
 Prue Standard, glider

Other businesses 
 American Standard Companies, a global provider of air conditioning systems and services, bath and kitchen products, and vehicle control systems
 Standard Bank, one of South Africa's largest financial operators
 Standard Fruit Company, an American company
 Standard Glass and Paint Company Building, listed on the National Register of Historic Places in Polk County, Iowa
 Standard Hotel, a hotel chain originating in Los Angeles
 Standard Insurance Company, an American insurance and financial company
 Standard Oil (1863–1911), a large integrated oil producing, transporting, refining, and marketing organization
 Standard Steel Casting Company, an American company
 Standard Talking Machine Company, an early twentieth century record label
 The Standard, Copenhagen, a restaurant complex in central Copenhagen, Denmark
 The Standard, East Village, a hotel in New York City
 The Standard, High Line, a hotel in New York City

Computing and technology
 Standards (software)
 Standard cell, a voltage reference, or a building block for electronic integrated circuits

Plants and plant husbandry
 Standard (tree), a type of fruit tree form
 Coppice with standards, the retention of some mature trees in a wood mainly of trees which are coppiced

Other uses
 Standard (typeface)
 Standard (warez), rules for unauthorized public release of copyrighted material

See also 

 Canon (disambiguation)
 Industry standard (disambiguation)
 National standards (disambiguation)
 Standardbred, an American horse breed best known for its ability in harness racing
 Standart (disambiguation)
 STD (disambiguation)
 The Standard (disambiguation)
 Usual (disambiguation)